50 (Northumbrian) Signal Regiment was a Territorial Army (TA) unit of the British Army's Royal Corps of Signals. It had its origins in a signal company and a cyclist battalion formed in 1908 and it provided the divisional signals for the 50th (Northumbrian) Division and its duplicates during World War II. Its successors continued in the postwar TA until 2009.

Origin

When the Royal Corps of Signals (RCS) was created in 1920 the 50th (Northumbrian) Divisional Signals was formed in the Territorial Army (TA). It combined the former 50th (Northumbrian) Signal Company of the Royal Engineers (RE) with the 5th (Cyclist) Battalion, East Yorkshire Regiment.

When the old Volunteer Force was subsumed into the Territorial Force (TF) after the Haldane reforms in 1908, the 1st Newcastle Engineer Volunteers provided the RE components of the TF's Northumbrian Division, including the Northumbrian (The Newcastle) Divisional Telegraph Company, RE, with the following organisation:<ref>[https://www.thegazette.co.uk/London/issue/28121/supplement/2155 London Gazette', 20 March 1908.]</ref>
 Company Headquarters (HQ) at Barras Bridge, Newcastle upon Tyne
 No 1 Section at Barras Bridge
 No 2 (Northumberland) Section
 No 3 (York & Durham) Section
 No 4 (Durham Light Infantry) Section
Nos 2–4 Sections were attached to and largely manned by the three infantry brigades of the division. The Telegraph Company was redesignated a Signal Company in 1911.

The division was immediately sent into action in the Second Battle of Ypres, and was engaged in many of the major actions on the Western Front for the rest of the war, including the later stages of the Battle of the Somme, the Battle of Arras, and the last phase of the Battle of Passchendaele. The division was virtually destroyed during the German spring offensive of 1918. The Divisional RE remained with the 50th while it was reconstituted with units brought back from other fronts. The division re-entered the line for the last month of the Allies' victorious Hundred Days Offensive. It was demobilised in March 1919.Wyrall, 50th Division.

After mobilisation, the TF units of the Northumbrian Division raised 2nd Line units with the same titles as the parents, but with a '2/' prefix, including the 2/1st Northumbrian Divisional Signal Company, RE. These units later constituted the 63rd (2nd Northumbrian) Division, responsible for coastal defence in North East England while supplying drafts to the 50th Northumbrian on the Western Front. However, the drain of supplying drafts was such that the division could not be kept up to strength: in July 1916 it was broken up and its number transferred to the 63rd (Royal Naval) Division. While the RE field companies were sent overseas, 63rd (2/1st Northumbrian) Signal Company was broken up for drafts in the UK.Becke, Pt 2b, pp. 49–54.

Royal Corps of Signals
The new 50th (Northumbrian) Divisional Signals was initially formed in 1920, with headquarters at Gateshead, and had absorbed the 5th (Cyclist) Bn, East Yorkshire Rgt by the following year when its HQ moved to 4 West Parade in Hull. It had the following organisation:
 1 Company at Darlington
 2 Company at Middlesbrough
 3 Company at Gateshead
The first Commanding Officer (CO) was Major C.L. Bagnall, a former officer in 9th Battalion, Durham Light Infantry, who had commanded No 4 Section of the company in 1914. He later became the unit's Honorary Colonel.

By the 1930s, 50th (Northumbrian) Signals HQ had moved to the Drill Hall at Darlington and also administered:
 206th Medium Artillery Signal Section, Drill Hall, The Green, Sunderland
 No 3 (Northumbrian) Air Squadron Signal Section (Supplementary Reserve, (SR)), Elmgrove Terrace Drill Hall, Gateshead-on-Tyne
 No 5 (Northumbrian) Air Squadron Signal Section (SR), Drill Hall, Darlington
 No 12 (Northumbrian) Air Squadron Signal Section (SR)
 No 14 (Northumbrian) Air Squadron Signal Section (SR)

By 1939 the SR units had left, but the unit was responsible for administering two newly-formed TA signal sections at Middlesbrough:
 271st Army Tank Brigade Signal Section
 253rd Light Anti-Aircraft Regiment Signal Section

World War II

Mobilisation
Following the Munich Crisis the TA was doubled in size. Once again, 50th (Northumbrian) Division formed a duplicate, 23rd (Northumbrian) Division, with its own divisional signals. 50th Division was mobilised on 3 September 1939 and 23rd Division became active on 2 October 1939.Joslen, pp. 81–2. The unit probably also provided the cadre to form 7th Anti-Aircraft Division Divisional Signals at Darlington.

50th (Northumbrian) Divisional Signals

Battle of France
The 50th Division joined the new British Expeditionary Force (BEF) in France in February 1940.Ellis, France & Flanders, p. 19. When the Germans attacked in May, the division moved up into Belgium with the rest of the BEF and took up positions on the River Dendre. However, the Germans broke through French lines and the BEF was forced to retreat. By 19 May, 50th Division was moved back to Vimy Ridge north of Arras to prepare for a counter-attack as part of 'Frankforce', in what became known as the Battle of ArrasEllis, France & Flanders, Chapter V. After this brief check, the Germans continued to advance. By now the BEF was cut off from the bulk of the French armies and began its retreat towards Dunkirk. 50th Division guarding an open flank and suffering heavy casualties.Ellis, France & Flanders, Chapter XII.Ellis, France & Flanders, Chapter XIV.Ellis, France & Flanders, p. 239. The division, less its heavy equipment, was evacuated from Dunkirk on 1 June and landed in the United Kingdom the following day.

North Africa
After re-equipping and retraining in the United Kingdom, 50th Division sailed on 23 April 1941 to join Middle East Forces. Following spells in Cyprus, Iraq and Syria, it joined British Eighth Army for the Battle of Gazala (26 May–21 June 1942), where part of the division was captured. Eighth Army fell back to the El Alamein position, which it successfully defended. 50th Division then took part in the Second Battle of El Alamein and the subsequent advance across North Africa to Tunisia, including the battles of Mareth and Wadi Akarit.

Sicily
For the Allied invasion of Sicily 50th Division was in the first assault wave and then fought its way up the east side of the island, including the Battle of Primosole Bridge.Barnes, pp. 3–55. With its experience of amphibious assaults, 50th Division was earmarked for the forthcoming invasion of Normandy (Operation Overlord) and sailed for Britain in October 1943.Barnes, pp. 53–5.

North West Europe
On D Day, 50th Division was heavily reinforced to carry out the landings on Gold Beach. Once off the beach, 50th Division pushed inland towards Bayeux, and then consolidated its gains over the next few days against German counter-attacks. Progress towards Villers-Bocage was held up by strong Panzer units.Joslen, p. 581.Barnes, pp. 74–9, 102–15 & Appendix C.

For the next two months the division fought its way slowly through the Bocage country before being relieved on 5 August.Barnes, pp. 116–31. However, it was back in action on 9 August, attacking against stiff opposition in the advance beyond Mont Pincon as the Allies closed the Falaise Gap. Once the Seine was crossed and the pursuit began, 50th Division supported 11th Armoured Division's rapid advance, protecting the flank and 'mopping up' local resistance. On 1 September the division secured bridges over the River Somme near  Amiens and reached Arras. On 3 September it took part in the Liberation of Brussels.Barnes, pp. 137–40.

More resistance was met at the Albert Canal, and 50th Division had to make an assault crossing in storm boats, following which the infantry pushed on and captured Gheel after bitter fighting. (7–11 September).Ellis, Germany, pp. 12–3. The division was due to play a minor role in Operation Market Garden, holding the bridgehead from which Guards Armoured Division advanced, and later defending the road and bridge at Nijmegen, but the latter turned into a major defensive battle after the defeat at Arnhem.Ellis, Germany, pp. 32, 42, 98.

The defence of the Nijmegen bridgehead was 50th Division's last operation. It was by now very weak, and in December 1944 it was broken up to provide reinforcements for other units in 21st Army Group. Most of the division's units returned to the UK as training cadres to turn surplus Royal Navy and Royal Air Force personnel into infantry, but divisional HQ and signals was kept together. Divisional Signals was demobilised on 31 July 1945, shortly before divisional HQ went to Norway to become HQ British Land Forces Norway.Ellis, Germany, pp. 158–9, 371.

23rd (Northumbrian) Divisional Signals
23rd (Northumbrian) Divisional Signals did not accompany the division when its infantry were sent to France to act as labour troops in April 1940. They got caught up in the fighting during the retreat to Dunkirk and suffered such heavy casualties in rearguard actions that the division was disbanded at the end of June after its return to England. The divisional signal unit was converted into a training school for non-commissioned officers at Harrogate, in which role it continued until the end of the war.

Postwar
When the TA was reconstituted in 1947, the unit reformed at Darlington from elements of 50th and 23rd Divisional Signals as 50 (Northumbrian) Infantry Divisional Signal Regiment. It adopted the title 50 (Northumbria) Division Signal Regiment in 1956. When the TA was reorganised in 1961, the division became 50th (Northumbrian) Division/District and the regiment (as 50 (Northumbrian) Signal Rgt) absorbed elements of 60th (Mixed) Signals Rgt at York, also taking over responsibility for two brigade signal squadrons:Lord & Watson, pp. 205–6.
 338 Sqn formed at Gateshead in 1959 from 149th Infantry Brigade Signals
 339 Sqn formed at Middlesbrough in 1959 from 151st Infantry Brigade Signals

When the TA was converted into the Territorial and Army Volunteer Reserve (TAVR) in 1967, the regiment was reduced to 50 (Northumbrian) Signal Squadron in 34 (Northern) Signal Regiment.Lord & Watson, p. 141.34 (Northern) Signal Rgt at MoD (archive).

34 (Northern) Signal Regiment in 12 Signal Brigade, had the NATO role of providing communications between the Channel Ports and the rear boundary of I (British) Corps in British Army of the Rhine. After 1993 this became the provision of theatre-level communications support for the Allied Rapid Reaction Corps as part of 11 Signal Brigade. However, 34 Signal Regiment was disbanded in 2009,
and the squadron transferred to 32 (Scottish) Signal Regiment. The squadron was re-titled as 50 (Northern) Signal Squadron, and in 2018 re-subordinated to 37 Signal Regiment.

Commanding Officers
The following served as Commanding Officer of the unit and its successors:

50th (Northumbrian) Divisional Signals
 Maj C.L. Bagnall, DSO, MC, TD, 19 July 1920
 Lt-Col W. Dennis, 1923
 Brevet Col A. MacLeod, 4 September 1925
 Bt Col G.H. Walton, 4 September 1930
 Lt-Col T.T.J. Sheffield, TD, 4 September 1936
 Lt-Col R. Stevenson-Wight, 1941
 Lt-Col A.B. De Lise, 1942
 Lt-Col G.B. Stevenson, 1943
 Lt-Col C.L. Ommanney, OBE, 1944

23rd (Northumbrian) Divisional Signals
 Lt-Col R. Stevenson-Wight

50 (Northumbrian) Infantry Divisional Signal Regiment
 Lt-Col R.M. Percival, TD, 1947
 Lt-Col W.A. Lee, OBE, TD, 1950
 Lt-Col G.F.H. Walker, OBE, TD, 1953

Honorary Colonels
The following served as Honorary Colonel of the unit:
 Maj C.L. Bagnall, DSO, MC, TD, appointed 28 November 1923
 Lt-Col H. Bowes, CB, TD, appointed 25 December 1935
 Brig Sir George Walton, KBE, CB, TD, appointed 1953

50 (Northern) Signal Squadron
Brigadier Paul Baker, OBE

Footnotes

Notes

References
 B.S. Barnes, The Sign of the Double 'T' (The 50th Northumbrian Division – July 1943 to December 1944), Market Weighton: Sentinel Press, 2nd Edn 2008, .
 Maj A.F. Becke,History of the Great War: Order of Battle of Divisions, Part 2a: The Territorial Force Mounted Divisions and the 1st-Line Territorial Force Divisions (42–56), London: HM Stationery Office, 1935/Uckfield: Naval & Military Press, 2007, .
 Maj A.F. Becke,History of the Great War: Order of Battle of Divisions, Part 2b: The 2nd-Line Territorial Force Divisions (57th–69th), with the Home-Service Divisions (71st–73rd) and 74th and 75th Divisions, London: HM Stationery Office, 1937/Uckfield: Naval & Military Press, 2007, .
 Maj L.F. Ellis, History of the Second World War, United Kingdom Military Series: The War in France and Flanders 1939–1940, London: HM Stationery Office, 1954/Uckfield, Naval & Military Press, 2004.
 Maj L.F. Ellis, History of the Second World War, United Kingdom Military Series: Victory in the West, Vol I: The Battle of Normandy, London: HM Stationery Office, 1962/Uckfield: Naval & Military, 2004, .
 Maj L.F. Ellis, History of the Second World War, United Kingdom Military Series: Victory in the West, Vol II: The Defeat of Germany, London: HM Stationery Office, 1968/Uckfield: Naval & Military, 2004, .
 
 Cliff Lord & Graham Watson, Royal Corps of Signals: Unit Histories of the Corps (1920–2001) and its Antecedents, Solihull: Helion, 2003, .
 Maj-Gen R.F.H. Nalder, The Royal Corps of Signals: A History of its Antecedents and Developments (Circa 1800–1955), London: Royal Signals Institution, 1958.
 Everard Wyrall, The Fiftieth Division 1914–1919, 1939/Uckfield: Naval & Military, nd, .
 Everard Wyrall, The East Yorkshire Regiment in the Great War 1914–1918'', London: Harrison, 1928/Uckfield,Naval & Military, 2002,

External sources
 The Long, Long Trail
 Orders of Battle at Patriot Files
 Land Forces of Britain, the Empire and Commonwealth – Regiments.org (archive site)
 Wartime Memories Project

Regiments of the Royal Corps of Signals
Military units and formations in County Durham
Borough of Darlington
Military units and formations established in 1947
Military units and formations disestablished in 1967